The 2009–10 season of the Slovak Superliga (also known as Corgoň Liga due to sponsorship reasons) was the 17th season of the league since its establishment. It would begin on 10 July 2009 and end on 15 May 2010. Slovan Bratislava are the defending champions.

Team changes from 2008–09
ViOn Zlaté Moravce were relegated after finishing the 2008–09 season in 12th and last place. They were replaced by 2008–09 1. Liga champions Inter Bratislava.

While the First League promotees will carry the name of the former Slovak champions, the team will actually play its home matches in Senica after a merger with fourth-division side FK Senica. An intended name change for the 2009–10 season was filed too late to be accepted, so the team will be renamed at the beginning of the following season.

In another name change, FC Artmedia Petržalka were renamed MFK Petržalka effective 1 July 2009.

Stadia and locations

League table

Results
The schedule consists of three rounds. The two first rounds consist of a conventional home and away round-robin schedule. The pairings of the third round were set according to the 2008–09 final standings. Every team played each opponent once for a total of 11 games per team.

First and second round

Third round
Key numbers for pairing determination (number marks position in final standings 2008–09):

Top goalscorers
Updated through games played on 15 May 2010; Source:

See also
2009–10 Slovak Cup
2009–10 Slovak First League

References

External links
 Slovak FA official site 
 Club Profiles by Weltfussballarchiv

Slovak
Slovak Super Liga seasons
1